Lethe  andersoni  is a species of Satyrinae butterfly found in the  Indomalayan realm ( Assam (Cherrapunji), Upper Burma, West China).

References

andersoni
Butterflies of Asia